Bloodletting is the eleventh studio album by American thrash metal band Overkill, released on October 24, 2000, by Metal-Is. It is the first after the departure of guitarists Joe Comeau and Sebastian Marino and the addition of Dave Linsk. Bloodletting also marked the first and only time since 1989's The Years of Decay that Overkill had recorded together as a four-piece.

Reception

The album sold around 2,450 copies in its first week of release in the U.S.

Track listing

Personnel
Bobby "Blitz" Ellsworth – lead vocals
D.D. Verni – bass, backing vocals
Dave Linsk – guitars
Tim Mallare – drums

Additional personnel
 Produced by Overkill
 Engineered by John Shyloski and John Montegnese
 Assistant engineered by Chris Jones
 Mixed by Colin Richardson at Sonalyst Studios
 Mastered by Roger Lian at Masterdisk, New York City, USA

References

External links
 Official OVERKILL Site

Overkill (band) albums
2000 albums
Albums with cover art by Travis Smith (artist)